Serhiy Mykhalchuk (born 13 July 1972, in Lutsk) is a Ukrainian cinematographer. He graduated in 1994 from the Kyiv Theater Institute of Karpenko-Karyj. In addition to film work, Mykhalchuk has also produced documentaries and television feature films, music videos, and advertising features.

Films
 2000 – Zakon (The Law) (directed by Aleksandr Veledinsky, Russia)
 2002 – Lubovnik (The Lover) (directed by Valeri Todorovsky, Russia)
 2003 – Mamay (directed by Oles Sanin, Ukraine) Oscar nominee of Ukraine
 2004 – Moy svodnyy brat Frankenshteyn (directed by Valeri Todorovsky, Russia)
 2005 – Contact (directed by Andrej Novoselov, Russia)
 2006 – I.D. (directed by Ghassan Shmeit, Syria)
 2008 – Las Meninas (directed by Ihor Podolchak, Ukraine)
 2008 – Illusion of Fear (directed by Oleksandr Kirienko, Ukraine)
 2014 – The Guide 
 2015 – Under Electric Clouds

Awards
 1999 – Lyubit kino (Love Cinema) film festival, Lumiere Brothers silver medal.
 2002 – San Sebastian International Film Festival, Best Photography award, for Lubovnik 
 2003 – Open Film Festival Kinoshock, Best Cinematographer, for Mamay
 2014 – Odessa International Film Festival, Best Cinematography, for The Guide
 2015 – Berlin International Film Festival, Silver Berlin Bear, for Under Electric Clouds

References

External links 
 

Ukrainian cinematographers
1972 births
Living people
Laureates of the Oleksandr Dovzhenko State Prize